Madonna Schacht (born 1940s) is an Australian former tennis player.

Tennis career
Active on tour in the 1960s, Schacht grew up in Gympie, Queensland and attended St Patrick's College.

Schacht went on her first overseas tour in 1962, reaching the round of 16 at Wimbledon on her first attempt.

During her career she was a three-time singles quarter-finalist at the Australian Championships and a quarter-finalist at the 1966 U.S. National Championships. Her title wins include the 1962 Irish Championships (singles) and 1965 Italian Championships (doubles).

Personal life
Schacht was involved in a high-profile custody battle in the 1970s with her former husband Dr Rudi Weber, a Monash University physicist. Weber, from whom she was separated, had taken her infant son to live with him in Europe. She was eventually able to regain custody after a year-long legal fight.

See also
List of Grand Slam girls' doubles champions

References

1940s births
Living people
Australian female tennis players
Tennis people from Queensland
People from Gympie